The Australian Feminist Law Journal is a biannual peer-reviewed academic journal covering feminist legal issues from a critical perspective. It was established in 1993 and is published by Routledge.

References

External links 

Journal page at Griffith University

Feminist journals
English-language journals
Publications established in 1999
Biannual journals
Routledge academic journals
1999 establishments in Australia